4.50 from Paddington is a detective fiction novel by Agatha Christie, first published in November 1957 by Collins Crime Club. This work was published in the United States at the same time as What Mrs. McGillicuddy Saw!, by Dodd, Mead. The novel was published in serial form before the book was released in each nation, and under different titles. The US edition retailed at $2.95.

Reviewers at the time of publication generally liked the novel, but would have liked more direct involvement of Miss Marple, and less consideration of her failing strength, using others to act for her. A later review by Barnard found the story short on clues, but favourably noted Lucy Eyelesbarrow as an independent woman character.

The 1961 film Murder, She Said was based on this novel as were several television programmes.

Plot summary
Mrs Elspeth McGillicuddy is on her way from a shopping expedition to visit her old friend Jane Marple for Christmas. Her train passes another train running parallel and in the same direction as her train. A blind in a compartment on the other train flies up, and she sees a man with his back to her strangling a woman. She reports it to a sceptical ticket collector who passes the report for investigation. When arriving at Miss Marple's cottage, she tells her everything. Mrs McGillicuddy describes the dying woman as having blonde hair and wearing a fur coat and the man as tall and dark, though she saw only his back. Miss Marple believes her story, knowing her friend to be trustworthy in description. With no report of a body found in the next day's news, Miss Marple sets out to determine where the body is. With a good map and several rides by train to feel the effect of a sharp curve on standing passengers, she determines that the body is probably in the grounds of Rutherford Hall. Miss Marple sends Lucy Eyelesbarrow, a young professional cook and housekeeper of her acquaintance, to work at Rutherford Hall and find the body.

Luther Crackenthorpe is a semi-invalid widower who lives at Rutherford Hall with his daughter Emma. Luther's father, not liking his son, wrote a will which left his property for his eldest grandson. Luther receives the income for life. After Luther's death, the capital is to be divided equally among Luther's surviving children, not unlike a tontine pension. The share of cash due to the living children rises as each sibling dies before their father.

Edmund, the firstborn son, died during World War II. Youngest daughter Edith ("Edie"), died four years before the novel begins, leaving a son, Alexander. The remaining children are Cedric, an Ibiza-based bohemian painter; Harold, a married businessman in the City of London; Alfred, who engages in shady business dealings; and Emma. Others at the family home include Alexander's father Bryan Eastley, and Alexander's school friend James Stoddart-West. Another character is local physician Dr Quimper, who looks after Luther and is in love with Emma.

Lucy uses golf practice as a cover for searching the grounds. She discovers fur from a woman's coat caught on a bush. Then she finds a cheap compact. Lucy takes these to Miss Marple, who believes the murderer knew all about Rutherford Hall, and had removed the body from the embankment where it had fallen away from the railway, driven a car outside the grounds at night and hidden the body. Lucy finds the woman's body hidden in a sarcophagus in the old stables containing Luther's collection of dubious antiques. Who was she?

The police, led by Inspector Craddock, identify the victim's clothing as purchased in Paris. Their enquiries lead them to think that the dead woman was a dancer, calling herself "Anna Stravinska", who had gone missing from a ballet troupe. However, "Anna Stravinska" is an alias, and the police cannot trace her origins.

Emma tells the police about two letters, one from her brother Edmund and written shortly before his death in the retreat to Dunkirk, and another received a few weeks before the woman's body is found. Her brother had said that he would marry a woman named Martine. The recent letter seemed to be from Martine, wanting to connect with the family of her son's father. There was no second letter, nor a meeting with Martine. The police conclude that the body in the sarcophagus is that of Martine until Lady Stoddart-West, mother of James, reveals her identity. She confirms that Edmund's letter spoke of her, but he died before they could marry. She spoke up only because her son told her of the letter supposedly from Martine. After Edmund's death, Martine had joined the Resistance, and briefly met Bryan Eastley who was escaping through France. At Rutherford Hall, she recognised him again instantly from "the way he stood, and the set of his shoulders". This incident seems to impress Miss Marple.

The whole family, apart from the absent Bryan and Alexander, take ill suddenly, and before long, Alfred is found dead at his residence. Later, the curry made by Lucy on the fateful day is found to contain arsenic. Some days later, Harold, after returning home to London, receives a delivery of tablets from Dr Quimper, who had told him not to take more, yet sends him more. Harold takes them; they are poisoned with aconitine, and he dies whilst being watched taking the tablets by Lady Alice, his wife.

Lucy arranges an afternoon-tea visit to Rutherford Hall for Miss Marple and Mrs McGillicuddy. Miss Marple instructs Mrs McGillicuddy to ask to use the lavatory as soon as they arrive. Miss Marple is eating a fish-paste sandwich when she begins to choke on a fish bone. Dr Quimper moves to assist her. Mrs McGillicuddy enters the room at that moment, sees the doctor's hands at Miss Marple's throat, and cries out, "But that's him – that's the man on the train!"

Miss Marple realised that her friend would recognise the real murderer if she saw him again in a similar pose. The dead woman was Quimper's wife, who would not divorce him, so he killed her to be free to marry Emma. After the Quimpers separated, she had joined a ballet troupe as Anna Stravinska. Quimper's scheme grew to killing Emma's brothers Alfred and Harold, so that the inheritance need not be shared.

He poisoned the cocktail jug, not the dinner, and added arsenic to the sample of curry he took before he gave it in for testing. He added a second dose of arsenic to Alfred's tea. He sent the poisoned tablets to Harold, as a prescription from him (which he then claimed was a forgery), explaining their deaths. Miss Marple then tells Mrs McGillicuddy and Inspector Craddock that Luther Crackenthorpe may die soon, that Emma will get over the doctor, and that there will be wedding bells for Lucy – though she refuses to be drawn on the identity of the groom (as mentioned in 'Agatha Christie's Secret Notebooks', it was at one time intended to be Cedric, although, since Agatha Christie sometimes changed details in the final version from those sketched out in her notebooks, this is not necessarily her final intention).

Characters
 Miss Marple: detective and protagonist.
 Elspeth McGillicuddy: witness to the murder on the train, a friend of Miss Marple.
 Lucy Eyelesbarrow: Miss Marple's younger collaborator at the Hall. She is a brilliant scholar, skilled cook and energetic housekeeper with a good reputation and excellent client list.
 David West: He works at British Railways and aids Miss Marple in knowing which trains might have passed the one Mrs McGillicuddy rode when she witnessed the murder. He is the second son of Miss Marple's nephew Raymond West.
 Luther Crackenthorpe: elderly widower with a life interest in Rutherford Hall, close with money since his own father died.
 Cedric Crackenthorpe: Luther's son, a bohemian painter living in Ibiza. As the eldest surviving son, he will inherit Rutherford Hall and surrounding lands when his father dies in addition to his share of the inheritance money.
 Harold Crackenthorpe: Luther's son, married businessman in London, with no children.
 Lady Alice Crackenthorpe: Harold's wife, daughter of an impoverished earl.
 Alfred Crackenthorpe: Luther's son, with no regular employment, on the edge of illegal activities.
 Emma Crackenthorpe: Luther's daughter, who lives at home and takes care of him.
 Bryan Eastley: widower of Edith Crackenthorpe, Luther's deceased younger daughter.
 Alexander Eastley: son of Edith and Bryan, who comes to Rutherford Hall on a school holiday.
 James Stoddart-West: school friend of Alexander.
 Lady Stoddart-West: mother of James.
 Dr Quimper: Luther's general practitioner.
 Detective-Inspector Dermot Craddock: godson of Sir Henry Clithering. (Craddock previously was featured in A Murder Is Announced and Clithering featured in that book and in The Thirteen Problems.)
 Armand Dessin: Inspector at the Paris Prefecture who assists Craddock in the investigation. Specifically, he names a missing person, a good Catholic woman who left her ballet troupe in England, and has not been seen since by those at the Ballet Maritski.
 Anna Stravinska: Dancer in the Ballet Maritski in Paris, which toured in England for six weeks before Christmas. She left the troupe in England on December 19. Stage name of Quimper's wife.
 Madame Joliet: Director of the Ballet Maritski in Paris.

Title
The UK title 4.50 from Paddington, specifies a train time departing in the afternoon from Paddington station, a major station in central London. In British style, the time is written as 4.50 (in later timetables it would be 16.50). The London railway stations were perhaps not considered well known by the US publisher, and thus the title in the US was changed to What Mrs McGillicuddy Saw!, which also refers to the moment on the train when the murder was seen.

Literary significance and reception
Philip John Stead's review in The Times Literary Supplement (29 November 1957) concluded that "Miss Christie never harrows her readers, being content to intrigue and amuse them." 

The novel was reviewed in The Times edition of 5 December 1957, stating, "Mrs Christie's latest is a model detective story; one keeps turning back to verify clues, and not one is irrelevant or unfair." The review concluded, "Perhaps there is a corpse or two too many, but there is never a dull moment."

Fellow crime writer Anthony Berkeley Cox, writing under the pen name of Francis Iles, reviewed the novel in the 6 December 1957 issue of The Guardian, in which he confessed to being disappointed with the work: "I have only pity for those poor souls who cannot enjoy the sprightly stories of Agatha Christie; but though sprightliness is not the least of this remarkable writer's qualities, there is another that we look for in her, and that is detection: genuine, steady, logical detection, taking us step by step nearer to the heart of the mystery. Unfortunately it is that quality that is missing in 4.50 from Paddington. The police never seem to find out a single thing, and even Miss Marples (sic) lies low and says nuffin' to the point until the final dramatic exposure. There is the usual small gallery of interesting and perfectly credible characters and nothing could be easier to read. But please, Mrs Christie, a little more of that incomparable detection next time."

Robert Barnard said of this novel that it was "Another locomotive one – murder seen as two trains pass each other in the same direction. Later settles down into a good old family murder. Contains one of Christie's few sympathetic independent women. Miss Marple apparently solves the crime by divine guidance, for there is very little in the way of clues or logical deduction."

Publication history 
 1957, Collins Crime Club (London), 4 November 1957, Hardcover, 256 pp.
 1957, Dodd Mead and Company (New York), November 1957, Hardcover, 192 pp.
 1958, Pocket Books (New York), Paperback, 185 pp.
 1960, Fontana Books (Imprint of HarperCollins), Paperback, 190 pp.
 1965, Ulverscroft Large-print Edition, Hardcover, 391 pp.
 1974, Pan Books, Paperback, 220 pp.
 2006, Marple Facsimile edition (Facsimile of 1962 UK first edition), 3 January 2006, Hardcover, 

In the UK the novel was first serialised in the weekly magazine John Bull in five abridged instalments from 5 October (volume 102 number 2675) to 2 November 1957 (volume 102 number 2679) with illustrations by K. J. Petts.

The novel was first serialised in the US in the Chicago Tribune in thirty six instalments from Sunday 27 October to Saturday 7 December 1957 under title Eyewitness to Death.

The novel was published in the US under the title What Mrs. McGillicuddy Saw! by Dodd, Mead and Co. The UK version was to be titled 4.54 from Paddington until the last minute, when the title and text references were changed to 4.50 from Paddington. This change was not communicated to Dodd Mead until after the book was being printed, so the text references to the time show 4:54 rather than 4:50.

An abridged version of the novel was also published in the 28 December 1957 issue of the Star Weekly Complete Novel, a Toronto newspaper supplement, under the title Eye Witness to Death with a cover illustration by Maxine McCaffrey.

Adaptations

Film in 1961

The book was made into a 1961 film starring Margaret Rutherford in the first of her four appearances as Miss Marple. This was the first Miss Marple film made.

BBC 'Miss Marple' Series 1987

The BBC film broadly follows the original plot with its 1987 version and stars Joan Hickson, (who also appeared as Mrs Kidder in the 1961 film, Murder, She Said). There are several changes:

 The poisoning of the family is absent.
 Alfred is still alive at the end, though suffering from a terminal illness that Dr Quimper apparently misdiagnosed deliberately. 
 As in the 1961 film, Harold is murdered in what appears to be a hunting accident, and not by poisoned tablets, because Dr Quimper suspected Harold knew who the victim was, as Harold had a deep passion for dancing and collected posters of the same ballet troupe she was in. 
 Anna Stravinka's real name is revealed as "Martine Isabelle Perrault" (in the novel, her real name is unknown). Thus the twist where James Stoddard-West's mother is Martine is deleted and the real Martine is not seen.
 Inspector Craddock is replaced by Inspector Duckham and the recurring characters from the BBC television series, Inspector Slack and Sergeant Lake.
 At the end, Miss Marple unambiguously opines that Lucy Eyelesbarrow will marry Bryan Eastley.
Cast:
Joan Hickson – Miss Marple
Jill Meager – Lucy Eyelesbarrow
David Beames – Bryan Eastley
Joanna David – Emma Crackenthorpe
Maurice Denham – Luther Crackenthorpe
John Hallam – Cedric Crackenthorpe
Robert East – Alfred Crackenthorpe
Bernard Brown – Harold Crackenthorpe
Andrew Burt – Dr Quimper
David Horovitch – Detective Inspector Slack
Mona Bruce – Mrs McGillicuddy

BBC Radio 1997

Michael Bakewell dramatised the novel as a single 90-minute episode, first broadcast in March 1997. June Whitfield played Miss Marple, and Susannah Harker Lucy Eyelesbarrow.

ITV Marple Series 2004

ITV adapted the novel for the series Marple in 2004 starring Geraldine McEwan as Miss Marple. The title What Mrs McGillicuddy Saw! was used when it was shown in the US. The adaptation contains several changes from the novel:

 Dr Quimper's first name, not mentioned in the novel, is given as David. His character was changed to be more sympathetic than he is in the novel. His motive for murdering his wife is his love for Emma rather than his desire for the Crackenthorpe inheritance.
 Only two murders occur – Quimper's wife, and Alfred. Harold is still alive at the end.
 Both the motive for killing Alfred, and the method of his murder, were changed. Alfred spotted Quimper planting a false clue on the grounds of the Hall, knowing that the body of his wife would be found. When Alexander and James show the clue to the family, Alfred decides to blackmail Quimper, boasting to Lucy just that he is due to receive money. When the family fall ill at dinner by a small dose of arsenic, Alfred is later killed in his bed by a fatal injection from Quimper; as he is being killed, Alfred cries out his killer's name. Quimper makes certain this is misconstrued as him calling for the doctor's help.
 In this version, Alfred is the eldest son after Edmund, and will inherit the Hall; Harold is the second-eldest son (He becomes next-in-line to inherit the Hall after Alfred dies) and Cedric is the youngest son.
 The name of Luther's father is changed from Josiah to Marcus and he manufactured confectionery rather than tea biscuits. 
 The novel's Inspector Dermot Craddock is replaced by Inspector Tom Campbell, an old friend of Miss Marple. This adaption ends with Lucy rejecting the two Crackenthorpe men in favour of the inspector.
 Bryan is British in the novel, but American in the adaption.
 The way Miss Marple reveals Dr Quimper as the murderer was changed; it take place on a train with Mrs McGillcuddy witnessing it from a passing train. When he is exposed, the communication cords on both trains are pulled, before Tom arrests Quimper whilst Mrs McGillcuddy switches to their train. Miss Marple then reveals all in her denouement aboard the train.
 Edmund is described as having been killed in the Battle of the Atlantic in December 1941, rather than dying at Dunkirk in 1940, and considered to be lost at sea. In addition, Edith's cause of death, not given in the novel, is described as death during childbirth.
 Anna Stravinska's true name is given as Suzanne Bellaine. Lucy finds the body within a mausoleum on the Hall's grounds, purely by chance, rather than in a barn containing antiquities. 
 Edmund did marry Martine, and brought her home to meet all his family. The visit is marred by Harold, who sexually assaults her.
 Harold Crackenthorpe's wife, Lady Alice, is given a much bigger role than in the novel.

In addition to these changes, Miss Marple is seen reading Dashiel Hammett's "Woman in the Dark and Other Stories", providing an inter-textual detail that suggests some of Miss Marple's detective insights come from her reading of classic murder fiction as well as her shrewd understanding of human nature.

Cast:
Geraldine McEwan – Miss Jane Marple
Amanda Holden – Lucy Eyelesbarrow
John Hannah – Inspector Tom Campbell
Michael Landes – Bryan Eastley
Niamh Cusack – Emma Crackenthorpe
David Warner – Luther Crackenthorpe
Ciarán McMenamin – Cedric Crackenthorpe
Ben Daniels – Alfred Crackenthorpe
Charlie Creed-Miles – Harold Crackenthorpe
Rose Keegan – Lady Alice Crackenthorpe
Griff Rhys Jones – Dr Quimper
Rob Brydon – Inspector Awdry
Pam Ferris – Mrs Elspeth McGillicuddy
Celia Imrie – Madame Joliet
Jenny Agutter – Agnes Crackenthorpe

2005 anime adaptation
The novel was adapted as a set of 4 episodes of the Japanese animated television series Agatha Christie's Great Detectives Poirot and Marple, airing in 2005.

Le crime est notre affaire
Le crime est notre affaire is a French film directed by Pascal Thomas, released in 2008. Named after the book Partners in Crime, and, like the book, starring Tommy and Tuppence as the detective characters, the film is in fact an adaptation of 4.50 from Paddington. The locations and names differ, but the story is essentially the same. The film is a sequel to Mon petit doigt m'a dit..., a 2004 film by Pascal Thomas adapted from By the Pricking of My Thumbs. Both are set in Savoy in the present day.

 Cast
 Catherine Frot – Prudence Beresford, based on Tuppence Beresford
 André Dussollier – Bélisaire Beresford, based on Tommy Beresford
 Claude Rich – Roderick Charpentier, based on Luther Crackenthorpe
 Annie Cordy – Babette Boutiti, based on Mrs McGillicuddy
 Chiara Mastroianni – Emma Charpentier, based on Emma Crackenthorpe
 Melvil Poupaud – Frédéric Charpentier, based on Alfred Crackenthorpe
 Alexandre Lafaurie – Raphaël Charpentier, based on Harold Crackenthorpe
 Christian Vadim – Augustin Charpentier, based on Cedric Crackenthorpe
 Hippolyte Girardot – Doctor Lagarde, based on Dr Quimper
 Yves Afonso – Inspector Blache

2010 Computer game 

On 17 June 2010, I-play released a downloadable hidden object game based on 4.50 from Paddington (see the external links). Dialogue interspersed with the hidden object puzzles follows the plot of the original story. Items mentioned in the dialogue are among those hidden in each round. The player finds locations on the map by textual clues, which makes the map a hidden object scene, too. At three points during play the player is asked to hypothesise on the identity of the murderer, but as in the novel there is little in the way of relevant evidence. Unlike the games based on Evil Under the Sun, Murder on the Orient Express, and And Then There Were None, this does not include any actual detection and unlike the latter two does not add an additional character to represent the player. This is the 4th in a series of Oberon Games' hidden object games based on Agatha Christie's novels, the first three were based on Death on the Nile, Peril at End House, and Dead Man's Folly.

TV Asahi Two Nights Drama Special 2018

TV Asahi adapted the novel in 2018 starring Yuki Amami and Atsuko Maeda, with the title Two Nights Drama Special: 4.50 from Paddington - Night Express Train Murder as the first night. The second night was The Mirror Crack'd from Side to Side.

Cast:
Yuki Amami – Toko Amano, based on Miss Jane Marple
Atsuko Maeda – Aya Nakamura, based on Lucy Eyelesbarrow
Sachie Hara – Keiko Tomizawa, based on Emma Crackenthorpe
Toshihiro Yashiba – Shin Furukawa, based on Bryan Eastley
Toshiyuki Nishida – Shinsuke Tomizawa, based on Luther Crackenthorpe
Kosuke Suzuki – Tetsuji Tomizawa, based on Cedric Crackenthorpe
Shinya Niiro – Seizo Tomizawa, based on Harold Crackenthorpe
Hiroyuki Matsumoto – Shiro Tomizawa, based on Alfred Crackenthorpe
Ken Ishiguro – Keiichi Saeki, based on Dr Quimper
Akio Mochizuki – Eiichi Tomizawa, based on Edmund Crackenthorpe
Mitsuko Kusabue – Suzume Amano, based on Mrs Elspeth McGillicuddy
Tomoka Kurotani – Reiko Kimura, based on Lady Stoddart-West
Ayumi Ena – Mamei Zhou, based on Anna Stravinska

References

External links
4.50 from Paddington at the official Agatha Christie website
4.50 from Paddington at the new Agatha Christie official website.

Agatha Christie:4:50 from Paddington game at I-Play website

1957 British novels
Miss Marple novels
Novels first published in serial form
Works originally published in John Bull (magazine)
Collins Crime Club books
Novels set in London
Novels set in England 
British novels adapted into films
British novels adapted into television shows